William Henry Wood (6 February 1881 – 13 January 1940) was a Canadian track and field athlete who competed in the 1908 Summer Olympics for Canada. He finished fifth in the Men's Marathon. He was born in Plymouth, England and died in London, Ontario.

References

External links
Olympic profile

1881 births
1940 deaths
Canadian male marathon runners
Olympic track and field athletes of Canada
Athletes (track and field) at the 1908 Summer Olympics